Chlorozancla is a genus of moths in the family Geometridae. It contains a single species, Chlorozancla falcatus, which was described in 1895.

References

Geometrinae